Jawahar Vidya Bhavan High School (often referred to as JVB), is an English, Hindi, Marathi medium school located in RCF Colony, Chembur East, Mumbai, India- 400074. It is affiliated to Maharashtra SSC Board, The school is named after Jawaharlal Nehru.

Campus 

The school building has two floors. The ground floor consists of many classrooms, science laboratory and school principal office. The first floor consists of secondary principal's cabin and an office with classrooms.

The second floor includes 4-5 classrooms. It also includes a computer lab, and a library. Two grounds are present within the school premises, the larger one is named as Jawahar ground. The ground is also used for the sports and annual sports day activities.

SSC curriculum 

Subjects offered include English/Marathi/Hindi as a first language as per the medium of a student. History, Geography, Algebra, Geometry, and Science are offered as per the SSC Maharashtra Board.

Activities 

The school organizes Annual Day, Annual Sports Day, and sports events. Students represent the school in inter-school activities including sports, drawing competitions, elocution and essay writing competitions, dance and quiz competitions, and scouting & guiding. The school also has an MCC group.

See also
 Chembur
 List of educational institutions in Mumbai
 Maharashtra State Board of Secondary and Higher Secondary Education
 jawaharlal Nehru

References

External links
 Official website

Schools in Mumbai
Monuments and memorials to Jawaharlal Nehru
Education in Maharashtra
1966 establishments in Maharashtra